The 1978 Boston Red Sox season was the 78th season in the franchise's Major League Baseball history. After 162 regular-season games, the Red Sox and the New York Yankees finished tied atop the American League East division, with identical 99–63 records. The teams then played a tie-breaker game, which was won by New York, 5–4. Thus, the Red Sox finished their season with a record of 99 wins and 64 losses, one game behind the Yankees, who went on to win the 1978 World Series.

Offseason 
 November 23, 1977: Mike Torrez was signed as a free agent by the Boston Red Sox.
 December 8, 1977: Don Aase and cash were traded by the Red Sox to the California Angels for Jerry Remy.
 December 14, 1977: Ferguson Jenkins was traded by the Red Sox to the Texas Rangers for John Poloni and cash.
 December 27, 1977: Dick Drago was signed as a free agent by the Red Sox.
 March 28, 1978: Denny Doyle was released by the Red Sox.
 March 30, 1978: Rick Wise, Mike Paxton, Ted Cox, and Bo Díaz were traded by the Red Sox to the Cleveland Indians for Dennis Eckersley and Fred Kendall.

Regular season 

The Red Sox played 163 games, as a tie-breaker game was needed to determine the winner of the AL East.

The "Boston Massacre" 
For several days in July, the Red Sox were 14 games ahead of the rival New York Yankees; at the end of play on July 19, Boston was 62–28 and New York was in fourth place at 48–42. However, the Yankees worked their way back. At the end of play on September 6, the Yankees had reduced the 14-game deficit to only four games, just in time for a four-game series at Fenway Park in Boston. The Yankees won all four games in the series, by a combined score of 42–9, leaving the teams tied with identical 86–56 records at the end of play on September 10. The series became known as the "Boston Massacre", named after the March 5, 1770, confrontation with British soldiers.

Tie-breaker game 
The Yankees held a one-game lead over the Red Sox before the final day of the regular-season schedule. With a Red Sox win over the Toronto Blue Jays, and a Yankee loss to the Cleveland Indians, the two teams finished the season in a tie for the AL East division title, both with records of 99–63. The next day, in a tie-breaker game played at Fenway Park, the Yankees beat the Red Sox, 5–4, with the help of a memorable home run by Bucky Dent.

The Yankees went on to win the World Series in six games over the Los Angeles Dodgers. Although Dent became a Red Sox demon, the Red Sox would get a measure of retribution in 1990, when the Yankees fired Dent as their manager during a series at Fenway Park.

Season standings

Record vs. opponents

Notable transactions 
 May 20, 1978: Bob Ojeda was signed as an amateur free agent by the Red Sox.

Opening Day lineup 

Source:

Roster

Player stats

Batting

Starters by position 
Note: Pos = Position; G = Games played; AB = At bats; R = Runs scored; H = Hits; Avg. = Batting average; HR = Home runs; RBI = Runs batted in; SB = Stolen bases

Other batters 
Note: G = Games played; AB = At bats; R = Runs scored; H = Hits; Avg. = Batting average; HR = Home runs; RBI = Runs batted in; SB = Stolen bases

Pitching

Starting pitchers 
Note: G = Games pitched; CG = Complete games; IP = Innings pitched; W = Wins; L = Losses; ERA = Earned run average; BB = Walks allowed; SO = Strikeouts

Other pitchers 
Note: G = Games pitched; IP = Innings pitched; W = Wins; L = Losses; ERA = Earned run average; BB = Walks allowed; SO = Strikeouts

Relief pitchers 
Note: G = Games pitched; W = Wins; L = Losses; SV = Saves; ERA = Earned run average; SO = Strikeouts

AL East tie-breaker game

Awards and honors 
Awards
 Dwight Evans – Gold Glove Award (OF)
 Fred Lynn – Gold Glove Award (OF)
 Jim Rice – American League Most Valuable Player, AL Player of the Month (May, August)

Accomplishments
 Jim Rice, American League leader, Hits (213)
 Jim Rice, American League leader, Home runs (46)
 Jim Rice, American League leader, RBIs (139)

All-Star Game
 Rick Burleson, reserve SS (did not attend)
 Dwight Evans, reserve OF
 Carlton Fisk, starting C
 Fred Lynn, reserve OF (started CF)
 Jerry Remy, reserve 2B
 Jim Rice, starting LF
 Carl Yastrzemski, reserve OF (did not attend)

Farm system 

LEAGUE CHAMPIONS: Bristol

Source:

References

Further reading

External links
 Home opener news coverage from WNAC-TV (April 14, 1978)
1978 Boston Red Sox team page at Baseball Reference
1978 Boston Red Sox season at baseball-almanac.com

Boston Red Sox seasons
Boston Red Sox
Boston Red Sox
Red Sox